Warrington is an unincorporated community located within Knowlton Township in Warren County, New Jersey, United States.

History
The early settlement was also known as "Kill Mills" and "Knowlton Mills".  It was described as a "thriving little place", with a population of 50 in 1882.  There was a blacksmith shop, and a public house known as "Leida's Hotel" or "Foster's Hotel".  Warrington had a grist mill in 1890.  These were gone by 1911.

A line of the Delaware, Lackawanna and Western Railroad—now abandoned—passed through Warrington.

The Warrington Stone Bridge is located north of the settlement. Built around 1860, it is still the largest stone arch roadway bridge in New Jersey, and is listed on both the New Jersey Register of Historic Places and National Register of Historic Places.

References

Knowlton Township, New Jersey
Unincorporated communities in Warren County, New Jersey
Unincorporated communities in New Jersey